Dawn of the Nine is the 12th studio album by the Swedish death metal band Unleashed. It was released on 27 April 2015 by Nuclear Blast Records.

Reception

Dawn of the Nine received positive reviews upon its release. Metal Sucks gave the album 3.5 out of 5 stars, commenting: "there is minimal respite from the full-on, brutal assault of uptempo, ultra-precise tech-death drumming and expert riffage/shreddy guitar soloing that will melt just about any face" whilst adding praise to the simplicity of the album with "there is a tasteful simplicity to the album’s stripped-down songwriting". Louder Than War rated the album 7 out of 10, calling the album: "a solid effort, and it certainly deserves your listen". Metal Hammer gave the album 3.5 out of 5 stars, commenting: "Viking veterans get older, wiser and meaner".

Track listing

Personnel

Unleashed
 Johnny Hedlund – Vocals, Bass, lyrics
 Fredrik Folkare – Lead guitar, music
 Tomas Olsson – Rhythm guitar
 Anders Schultz – drums

Production
 Fredrik Folkar – Engineering, Production
 Pär Olofsson – Cover art
 Erik Martensson – Mastering
 Soile Siirtola – Photography
 Joakim Sterner – Layout

References

External links
  Unleashed Homepage

Unleashed (band) albums
2015 albums
Nuclear Blast albums
Death metal albums

pl:As Yggdrasil Trembles